Çukuröz can refer to:

 Çukuröz, Bayat
 Çukuröz, Eldivan